Sikukia flavicaudata is a species of cyprinid in the genus Sikukia. It inhabits the Mekong basin in Laos and Yunnan, China. It occurs in large rivers, is considered harmless to human,. and is classified as "data deficient" on the IUCN Red List.

References

Cyprinid fish of Asia
Freshwater fish of China
Fish of Laos
IUCN Red List data deficient species